Minisode 2: Thursday's Child is the fourth Korean-language extended play (EP) (fifth overall) by South Korean boy band Tomorrow X Together. It was released on May 9, 2022, through Big Hit Music and Republic Records. Centered on an "intense" and "dark" concept, the EP consists of five tracks, including the lead single "Good Boy Gone Bad".

Background

On April 6, 2022, Big Hit Music announced that TXT would make a comeback in early May.

Critical reception
NME in the review called ‘Thursday’s Child’,another leap forward for TXT, displaying continued inventiveness and improvement, and adding yet more creative credits to their resumes. It also captures TXT's journey of romantic grief, from the stormy "Opening Sequence" to the anger in "Good Boy Gone Bad".

‘Thursday’s Child’ was named the eighth-best K-pop album of 2022 by Billboard, sharing how the group "cover a lot of stylistic ground in just 15 minutes on 'Minisode 2: Thursday’s Child'" while mentioning "Good Boy Gone Bad," "Thursday's Child Has Far to Go" and "Trust Fund Baby" as standouts.

Commercial performance
On April 20, 2022, the pre-orders for Minisode 2: Thursday's Child surpassed 810,000 copies, six days after the announcement, exceeding TXT's previous career high of 520,000 pre-orders for The Chaos Chapter: Freeze. The album surpassed 1.44 million pre-orders on the day of release and sold 910,000 copies on its first day after release.

Track listing

Charts

Weekly charts

Monthly charts

Year-end charts

Certifications

Release history

References

2022 EPs
Korean-language EPs
Tomorrow X Together albums
Hybe Corporation EPs
Republic Records EPs